Tanveer Imam (born 1 January 1960) is a Bangladesh Awami League politician and the incumbent Jatiya Sangsad member representing the Sirajganj-4 constituency.

Early life
Imam was born on 1 January 1960. His father, Hossain Toufique Imam, was an adviser to Prime Minister Sheikh Hasina.

Career
Imam was elected to Parliament in 2014 from Sirajganj-4 as a Bangladesh Awami League candidate.

On 9 September 2017, Imam was injured while getting of a running train after dropping off his wife in Pakshi Station. Ashim Kumar Talukder,  Divisional Railway Manager, suspended the Station Master, Shamsul Alam, and formed a two-member committee to investigate the incident.

In November 2017, Imam criticised the Health and Family Welfare Minister for failing to provide proper healthcare in Bangladesh.

References

Living people
1960 births
Awami League politicians
10th Jatiya Sangsad members
11th Jatiya Sangsad members
Place of birth missing (living people)